Moti or Motir is a volcanic island in the western side of Halmahera island, Indonesia. While administratively part of the city of Ternate, it is situated between the islands of Tidore to its north and Makian to its south. The 5 km wide island is surrounded by coral reefs. Its summit is truncated and the volcano contains a crater at the south-west side.

Moti has an area of 24.78 km2 and had a population of 4,811 at the 2020 Census; it is governed as the district (kecamatan) of Moti within the City (kota) of Ternate.

See also 

 List of volcanoes in Indonesia

References 

Stratovolcanoes of Indonesia
Volcanoes of Halmahera
Mountains of Indonesia
Ternate
Islands of the Maluku Islands
Landforms of North Maluku